The Sasthamangalam Mahadevar Temple is an ancient Hindu temple in the Sasthamangalam ward of Thiruvananthapuram Municipal Corporation, Kerala State, India. It is located on top of a hill away from the city centre to promote the spiritual tranquility of the shrine. The temple is more than 700 years old according to the available records, and was regularly visited by the Kings of Travancore. It is administered by the Travancore Devaswom Board.

Foundation legend
The foundation legend is that when the site of the temple was still grassland, a woman cutting grass sharpened her knife on a rock lying on the ground, and the rock bled. On further investigation it was confirmed that the piece of stone was a shiva lingam and it was consecrated. The temple was constructed round the spot in due course.

Deities and sub-deities
In this temple the main deity is Lord Shiva as Uma Maheshwara, and the sub-deities are Ganapathi, Murugan and Dharma Sastha (Ayyappan). Outside the temple compound on the banks of Killi River, murthis of Bhadrakali and Veerabhadran, Nagarajah and Nagayakshi are consecrated.

Main Festivals
The main annual temple festival here lasts for ten days, commencing on the Thiruvathira Star Day with the hoisting of a flag on the golden flagstaff in the Malayalam month of Dhanu and ending with the Aarattu ceremony on the tenth day (in December–January according to the western calendar). The ceremonies of Pradosham, Shivrathri, Makara Vilakku and so on are all auspicious at this temple.

Usual offerings
Offerings are made by devotees in the form of anointing the deity with water, rosewater, milk, tender coconut water, ghee and so on; presenting garlands made up of sacred leaves of the bael tree (vilwa leaves in Sanskrit, koovalam in Malayalam); Ganapathi Homam, Mrityunjaya Homam (fire rituals); Archana; Muzhukappu (adorning the deities with sandalwood paste); payasam (sweet porridge) and so on. Annadanam (feast) is offered on festival days.

Beliefs and customs
In most of the Shiva temples such as Sreekanteswaram Mahadeva Temple, Thiruvananthapuram, going round the sanctum (Sree kovil) is not allowed: the custom is to finish three quarters of the  pradakshinam (circumambulation) and then to return and start from the beginning. (This is because crossing the passage of the holy water somasootham is not allowed). In this temple, however, as a practice followed from the early days and found by astrological consultation (deva prasnam) not to be wrong, the full pradakshinam is allowed.

Even though there is no murthi or shrine for Devi Parvathi, the consort of Lord Shiva, the belief is that the presence of Devi Parvathi is also there, as stated in an ancient poem which is recited in this temple.

See also
Sreekanteswaram Mahadeva Temple, Thiruvananthapuram
Vaikom Temple
Peroor Sree Krishna Swamy Temple
Anandavalleeswaram Temple,Kollam
Thycaud Dharma Sastha Temple, Thiruvananthapuram

References

Hindu temples in Thiruvananthapuram district
Shiva temples in Kerala
108 Shiva Temples